Vest-Telemark is a traditional district in Norway. The  area comprises the western areas of the larger region known as Upper Telemark in Vestfold og Telemark county. The region consists of six municipalities: Fyresdal, Tokke, Vinje, Nissedal, Kviteseid, and Seljord. In 2020, there were 13,903 residents in the region. The area of Vest-Telemark was historically called .

The region is known for its folk traditions within music, clothing, handcrafts, food, and architecture. The region is also distinctly marked by its dialects of Norwegian. This form of Norwegian is among those containing the most traces of the Old Norse language and grammar. This area uses the Nynorsk written form of Norwegian.

Vest-Telemark is also the home of slalom (slalåm) skiing, Telemark skiing, and ski jumping (with its characteristic Telemark landing). "The Cradle of Modern Skiing" is found in Morgedal.

Municipalities

Notable people from Vest-Telemark
 Aslaug Vaa, author from Rauland in Vinje
 Vidkun Quisling, politician from Fyresdal
 Aasmund Olavsson Vinje, author from Vinje
 Tarjei Vesaas, author from Vinje
 Odd Nordstoga, musician from Vinje
 Sondre Norheim, father of modern skiing who was from Morgedal
 Ivar Peterson Tveiten, politician from Fyresdal
 Anne Grimdalen, sculptor from Skafså in Tokke
 Eivind Groven, composer from Lårdal in Tokke
 Eivind Hovden, guitarist from Dalen in Tokke
 Dyre Vaa, sculptor from Rauland in Vinje
 Halldis Moren Vesaas, author from Vinje
 Terje Haakonsen, master snowboarder Vinje
 Sven Erik Kristiansen, internationally acclaimed musician Rauland in Vinje

References

Districts of Vestfold og Telemark